Joe Vannelli (born 28 December 1950) is a Canadian musician, composer and record producer. He was credited on most records of his brother, Gino Vannelli, and in collaboration with youngest brother Ross Vannelli, the three have won many awards.

Vannelli studied music theory in Montreal, and learned to play piano. He was influenced by artists like Bill Evans, Oscar Peterson, Dave Brubeck and Erroll Garner. During the seventies he developed an interest in electronic instruments; he was one of the early synthesizer players. He contributed to most of Gino's albums as a composer, producer, arranger, programmer and engineer.

Apart from his work with Gino and Ross, he has been credited by many artists like Chaka Khan, Eartha Kitt, Gary Morris, David Meece, Kudasai, Marilyn Scott, Jimmy Haslip, REO Speedwagon, Brenda Russell, Pat Thomi, Don Sebesky, Kit Chan, Bill Meyers, Gianni Bella and Glenn Jones.

Musical career
Gino and Joe moved to Los Angeles in 1972. Desperate and broke, they waited for hours in the parking lot outside A&M Studios, hoping to get a record deal. When Herb Alpert, the co-owner of A&M Records, finally emerged, Vannelli ran toward him and gave him a demo tape while being chased by security guards. Alpert signed Vannelli and released his debut album, Crazy Life, in the summer of 1973.

For most of Gino's career, Joe was his keyboard player and arranger. In the early 70's Joe would overdub most of the  multiple keyboard parts to create that certain progressive sound of the early 1970s. This was a time when polyphonic synthesizers weren't around.

Along with Gino, he co produced the 1986 Chronology album for David Meece which was released on Myrrh Records and co wrote "Seventy Times Seven" and "Come That Day". 
Vannelli and Burton Cummings co-produced Cummings's  2008 album Above the Ground which was the first album release for Cummings in approximately 18 years.

In 2007 he co-produced Find Your Own Way Home for REO Speedwagon.

In 2009 he produced Not So Silent Night...Christmas with REO Speedwagon for REO Speedwagon.

Vannelli has won six Juno Awards and was nominated for several Grammy Awards, including one for best arrangement. One Juno award was for Recording Engineer of the Year. This was shared with his other brother Ross for "Black Cars" that appeared on Gino Vannelli's album of the same name. The following year more awards came for "Wild Horses" and "Young Lover".

Today, Joe Vannelli has a studio in Agoura Hills, California called Blue Moon Studios.

Selected discography

As sideman
With Jimmy Haslip
Red Heat (2000)
Nightfall (Vie Records, 2010)

References

External links

 

1950 births
Living people
20th-century Canadian composers
20th-century Canadian male musicians
21st-century Canadian composers
21st-century Canadian male musicians
Anglophone Quebec people
Canadian expatriate musicians in the United States
Canadian male composers
Canadian people of Italian descent
Canadian record producers
Jack Richardson Producer of the Year Award winners
Juno Award for Recording Engineer of the Year winners
Musicians from Montreal